Akdeniz is an urban municipality in Mersin, Turkey.

Akdeniz may also refer to:
 Mediterranean Sea, which is named Akdeniz in Turkish
 Akdeniz Airlines, a defunct charter airline from Turkey
Akdeniz University, a university in Antalya Province, Turkey
Akdeniz (sculpture), a sculpture by Ilhan Koman
MV Akdeniz, a 1955-built Turkish passenger ship

People with the surname
Deniz Akdeniz (born 1990), Australian actor
Ferhat Akdeniz (born 1986), Turkish volleyball player

See also
 Mediterranean (disambiguation)

Turkish-language surnames